The Neosho Yankees were a minor league baseball team based in Neosho, Missouri from 1938 to 1940. After beginning play as the 1937 Neosho Night Hawks, Neosho teams played exclusively as members of the Class D level Arkansas–Missouri League. Adopting their nickname, Neosho served as a minor league affiliate of the New York Yankees from 1938 to 1940. Neosho teams played home games at High School Stadium.

History
Neosho, Missouri first had a minor league baseball in 1937. The Neosho Night Hawks became a member of the five–team Arkansas–Missouri League in 1937, playing at High School Stadium. The Night Hawks finished the 1937 Arkansas–Missouri League in 4th place with a 52–71 record, 25.0 games behind the 1st place Rogers Lions. Playing under Manager Dennis Burns, Neosho lost to Rogers 3 games to 1 in the Playoffs.

In 1938, Neosho became an affiliate of the New York Yankees and captured Arkansas–Missouri League Pennant. The newly named Neosho Yankees finished the regular season with a record of 73–42 under  returning manager Dennis Burns. Neosho finished 5.5 games ahead of the 2nd place Carthage Pirates, who had just joined the six–team league. In the 1938 Playoffs, Neosho swept the Rogers Reds in three games to advance to the Finals. In the Arkansas–Missouri League Finals, the Carthage Pirates defeated Neosho 4 games to 1.

The Arkansas–Missouri League played with four teams in 1939. In the regular season, the Neosho Yankees ended with a record of 65–61, finishing in 3rd place. Playing again under manager Dennis Burns, Neosho finished 16.5 games behind the 1st place Fayetteville Angels. Nesho did not qualify for the 1939 playoffs. Ralph Houk played for Neosho in 1939, his first professional season. With a salary of $70.00 a month, Houk played well enough (.286) that Neosho hosted a "Ralph Houk dDay" at the ballpark.

In 1940, the four–team Arkansas–Missouri League permanently folded during the season, as Neosho played it final minor league season. The league folding became unavoidable after the Fayetteville Angels franchise folded due to poor attendance. On July 1, 1940 the league folded after hosting an All-Star game. At the time the league folded, the Neosho Yankees were in 2nd place with a 27–29 record under manager Ed Grayston and were 10.5 games behind the 1st place Carthage Pirates.

Neosho, Missouri has not hosted another minor league team.

The ballpark
Neosho teams were noted to have played minor league home games at High School Stadium. High School Stadium had a capacity of 1,000 in 1939, with dimensions of (Left, Center, Right) 310–340–310. The ballpark location was noted as near South Neosho Boulevard & Stadium Drive. Today, the Neosho High School stadium is named Bob Anderson Stadium. The location is 511 South Neosho Boulevard, Neosho, Missouri.

Timeline

Year–by–year record

Notable alumni
Dennis Burns (1937–1939, MGR)
Ralph Houk (1939) Manager: 2x World Series Champion - New York Yankees (1960–1961) 
Chuck Orsborn (1939)

See also
Neosho Yankees players

References

External links
 Baseball Reference

Baseball teams established in 1937
Defunct minor league baseball teams
Sports clubs disestablished in 1940
1937 establishments in Missouri
1940 disestablishments in Missouri
Defunct baseball teams in Missouri
Professional baseball teams in Missouri
New York Yankees minor league affiliates
Baseball teams disestablished in 1940
Newton County, Missouri
Defunct Arkansas-Missouri League teams